The 1970–1971 Buffalo Sabres season was the Sabres' 1st season in the National Hockey League.

The Sabres had the first pick in the 1970 NHL Amateur Draft, which they used to select Gilbert Perreault. Led by Perreault's NHL rookie record of 38 goals, the Sabres would 24–39–15, ahead of the Vancouver Canucks and Detroit Red Wings in the Eastern Division. However, they finished 19 points behind the Toronto Maple Leafs in the division, and finished 19 points short of a playoff berth.

The Sabres played their home games in the Buffalo Memorial Auditorium. "The Aud" was previously home of the Buffalo Bisons AHL team. To make way for the Sabres the Bisons folded following the 1969–70 AHL season, which saw the Bisons win their fifth and final Calder Cup. For the Sabres first season played the Aud had an ice hockey seating capacity of only 12,280 for hockey. The arena would be renovated following the season to expand capacity.

Offseason 
The Buffalo Sabres, along with the Vancouver Canucks, joined the NHL in the 1970–71 season. The Sabres' first owners were Seymour and Northrup Knox, scions of a family long prominent in western New York. The team's name, selected through a fan contest, was chosen because it was known as a weapon carried by leaders, and it is also swift and strong on offense as well as defense. The Knoxes had tried twice before to get an NHL team, first when the NHL expanded in 1967, and then unsuccessfully attempting to buy the Oakland Seals with the intent of moving them to Buffalo. At the time of their creation, the Buffalo Sabres exercised their option to create their own AHL farm team, the Cincinnati Swords. On June 9, 1970, the 1970 NHL Expansion Draft was held to fill the Sabres' and Canucks' rosters.

NHL draft 
In 1970, two new franchises were awarded in the NHL — the Buffalo Sabres and the Vancouver Canucks. Sabres general manager/coach Punch Imlach chose his favorite number, number 11, for the roulette wheel spin to determine which franchise would have the first choice in the 1970 Entry Draft. Ultimately, the Canucks were allocated numbers 1–10 on the wheel, while the Sabres had 11–20. When league president Clarence Campbell spun the wheel, he initially thought the pointer landed on 1. However, while Campbell was congratulating the Vancouver delegation, Imlach asked Campbell to check again. As it turned out, the pointer was on 11. This was the first year that the Montreal Canadiens did not have a priority right to draft Québécois junior players. Consequently, Perreault was available and taken first overall by the Sabres.

Transactions

Free Agency

Claimed via Waivers

Lost via Waivers

1970 NHL Intraleague Draft

Regular season

Punch Imlach 
After being fired by the Leafs, it was expected that Imlach would join the NHL's new Vancouver franchise. Imlach, Joe Crozier, and Foster Hewitt had become partners in the Vancouver Canucks of the Western Hockey League and were in line to become owners of the Vancouver NHL team. But they didn't have the financial resources to buy the team, which went to Medical Investment Corporation (Medicor). Medicor bought the WHL Canucks for $2.8 million, with Imlach making a reported gain of more than $250,000. He was offered a job with the NHL Canucks, but instead accepted an offer from the NHL's other expansion team, the Buffalo Sabres, as their first coach and general manager in 1970.

Season standings

Schedule and results

Player statistics

Forwards 
Note: GP = Games played; G = Goals; A = Assists; Pts = Points; PIM = Penalty minutes

Defencemen 
Note: GP = Games played; G = Goals; A = Assists; Pts = Points; PIM = Penalty minutes

Goaltending 
Note: GP = Games played; W = Wins; L = Losses; T = Ties; SO = Shutouts; GAA = Goals against average

Awards and records 
 Calder Memorial Trophy: Gilbert Perreault

References

External links 
 Sabres on Hockey Database
 Sabres Ready and Touché films from the Sabres inaugural season

Buffalo Sabres seasons
Buff
Buff
Buffalo
Buffalo